Magic Link may refer to:

 Magic Link, a personal communicator and PDA marketed by Sony from 1994
 :Help:Magic links, automatic links for certain unique identifiers that require no markup